Schools of the Ottawa Catholic School Board.

Elementary
Assumption School
Chapel Hill Catholic School
Convent Glen Catholic School
Corpus Christi School 
Divine Infant School
Dr. F. J. McDonald Catholic School
Georges Vanier Catholic School 
Good Shepherd School
Guardian Angels School
Holy Cross School
Holy Family Catholic School 
Holy Redeemer School
Holy Spirit School
St. John Paul II Catholic School (formerly known as Pineview Catholic School) 
Monsignor Paul Baxter School
Our Lady of Fatima Catholic School 
Our Lady of Mount Carmel School
Our Lady of Peace School
Our Lady of Victory Catholic School 
Our Lady of Wisdom Catholic School
Prince of Peace School
St. Andrew School
St. Anne School
St. Anthony School
St. Augustine School
St. Bernard School
St. Benedict School
St. Brigid School
St. Brother André Catholic School (formerly known as Elmridge Catholic School) 
St. Catherine School
St. Cecilia School
St. Clare School
St. Daniel School
St. Dominic School
St. Elizabeth School
St. Elizabeth Ann Seton School
St. Emily School
St. Francis of Assisi Catholic School
St. Gabriel School
St. Gemma School (formerly known as McMaster Catholic School) 
St. George School
St. Gregory School
St. Isidore School
St. Isabel School
St. James School
St. Jerome School
St. John XXIII School
St. John the Apostle School
St. Kateri Tekakwitha Elementary School (formerly known as Blessed Kateri Tekakwitha School)
St. Leonard School
St. Luke School (Barrhaven)
St. Luke Elementary School (Hawthorne Meadows)
St. Marguerite d'Youville School
St. Martin De Porres School
St. Mary School School
St. Michael School (Vanier)
St. Michael School (Corkery)
St. Michael School (Fitzroy)
St. Monica School
St. Patrick School
St. Philip School
St. Rita School
St. Rose of Lima School (formerly known as Bayshore Catholic) 
St. Stephen School
St. Theresa School
St. Thomas More School
Thomas D'Arcy McGee Catholic School

Intermediate
Frank Ryan Catholic Intermediate School

Secondary
St. Nicholas Adult High School 
M. F. McHugh Education Centre 
All Saints Catholic High School
Holy Trinity Catholic High School
Immaculata High School
Lester B. Pearson Catholic High School
Mother Teresa High School
Notre Dame High School
Sacred Heart High School
St. Joseph High School
St. Mark Catholic High School
St. Matthew High School
St. Patrick's High School
St. Paul High School
St. Peter High School
St. Pius X High School
St. Francis Xavier Catholic High School

Closed
St. Victor School (closed 1999; now École élémentaire catholique Lamoureux) 
St. Raymond's Intermediate School (closed 2000; now École élémentaire catholique Terre-des-Jeunes) 
St. Margaret Mary School (closed 2002; demolished 2004)
Pauline Vanier Intermediate School (closed 2007; demolished 2008)
St. Mary's Catholic School (closed 2008; now St. Ambrose Training Centre of Excellence) 
Jean Vanier Catholic Intermediate (closed 2009)
Uplands Catholic Elementary School (closed 2017)
St. Patrick's Intermediate School (closed 2018)

See also
List of school districts in Ontario
List of high schools in Ontario

References

Canada
Ottawa Catholic School Board